Mohamed Saïd El Wardi (born 19 April 1972) is a Moroccan athlete who specializes in the 5000 metres and cross-country running. He was born in Khouribga. He represented his country at the 2000 Summer Olympics.

International competitions

Personal bests
1500 metres - 3:34.85 min (2000)
3000 metres - 7:34.67 min (2000)
5000 metres - 13:04.46 min (2000)
10,000 metres - 28:26.25 min (2004)
Half marathon - 1:01:33 min (2003)

External links
 
 
 

1972 births
Living people
People from Khouribga
Moroccan male long-distance runners
Olympic athletes of Morocco
Athletes (track and field) at the 2000 Summer Olympics
World Athletics Championships athletes for Morocco
20th-century Moroccan people
21st-century Moroccan people